Otto Unverdorben (13 October 1806 – 28 November 1873) was a German chemist and merchant who was born in Dahme/Marke. After completing his schooling in Dresden, he studied chemistry at Halle, Leipzig and Berlin.

In 1826 at the age of 20, Unverdorben discovered aniline, which he obtained from the distillation of natural vegetable indigo. He called his discovery Crystallin. Aniline is important in the manufacture of dyes, plastics, and pharmaceuticals. In 1829 he returned to his hometown of Dahme/Mark and became successful in the cigar industry.

Today the Otto-Unverdorben Dahme-Oberschule is named in his honor.

References
 
Biography from the Otto Unverdorben school
wikisource: Allgemeine Deutsche Biographie Otto Unverdorben

This article is based on a translation of an article from the German Wikipedia.

1806 births
1873 deaths
People from Dahme, Brandenburg
People from the Electorate of Saxony
19th-century German chemists
Martin Luther University of Halle-Wittenberg alumni
Leipzig University alumni
Humboldt University of Berlin alumni